Attorney General O'Loghlen may refer to:

Bryan O'Loghlen (1828–1905), Attorney General of Victoria
Michael O'Loghlen (1789–1842), Attorney General for Ireland